Earl William Eby (November 18, 1894 – December 14, 1970) was an American sprinter who won a silver medal in the 800 m at the 1920 Summer Olympics. Earlier at the 1919 Inter-Allied Games he won the 400 m event and placed second in the 800 m to New Zealand's Daniel Mason. He won the 800 m event at the 1920 USA Outdoor Track and Field Championships.

He was born in Aurora, Illinois, but attended high school in Chicago, first Calumet High and then Loyola Academy. He died in Valley Forge, Pennsylvania.

References

1894 births
1970 deaths
American male middle-distance runners
Athletes (track and field) at the 1920 Summer Olympics
Medalists at the 1920 Summer Olympics
Olympic silver medalists for the United States in track and field
Sportspeople from Aurora, Illinois
Track and field athletes from Illinois